Héctor Oscar Campos (born 27 August 1945) is a sailor from Argentina. Campos represented his country at the 1972 Summer Olympics in Kiel. Campos took 22nd place in the Soling with Ricardo Boneo as helmsman and Pedro Ferrero as fellow crew member.

References

South American Champions Soling

Living people
1945 births
Argentine male sailors (sport)
Sailors at the 1972 Summer Olympics – Soling
Olympic sailors of Argentina